Govardhan Hill (Pronunciation: [ɡoʋəɾdʱən]), also called Mount Govardhana and Giriraj, is a sacred Hindu site in the Mathura district of Uttar Pradesh, India on an 8 km long hill located in the area of Govardhan and Radha Kund, which is about  from Vrindavan. It is the sacred centre of Braj and is identified as a natural form of Krishna, the Govardhana Shila.

Etymology
The name 'Govardhana' has two primary translations. In the literal meaning, 'Go' translates to 'cows', and 'vardhana' translates to 'nourishment'. Another meaning of 'Go' is 'the senses' and 'vardhana' can also mean 'to increase' - thus the name is also translated by devotees of Krishna as 'that which increases the senses' in their attraction to Krishna. In this connection, it is believed that the personality of Govardhan blesses the devotee by increasing his devotion (bhakti).

Geography 
At the southern end of the hill is the village of Punchari, while at the crest stand the villages of Aanyor and Jatipura. The parikarma path of Govardhan hill is intersected by some part of district Bharatpur of Rajasthan.

Background 
Govardhan Hill is considered a sacred site because it is the setting for many legends relating to the life of Lord Krishna, the deity believed to be embodied in the earth of the hill. Krishna and his brother Balarama are said to have spent many happy hours roaming among its shade providing groves, pools, caves and lush cow-pastures. An Eden-like sanctuary, the area's waterfalls, garden-grove (van), arbour (nikunj), water tank (kund), and flora are depicted in scenes of Krishna's adventures with Radha.

Temples

The buildings and other structures on the Hill date from the sixteenth century. , there is no known archaeological evidence of any remains of greater age.

A few of the sites include:
 The sandstone monument and lake of Kusum Sarovar.

 Giriraj Temple
. The Giriraji is dressed as Shrinathji every night as it is believed Shrinathji comes to Govardhan every night.

Shri Mahaprabhuji Baithakji- The Baithak of Mahaprabhuji Shri Vallabhacharya, that is in front Giriraj Temple.

 Shri Chaitanya Temple, built of red sandstone and adorned with paintings of Krishna and Radha
 Radha Kund Temple
 Mansi Ganga Lake

 Danghati Temple

Legends 
There are legends of Krishna’s saving the hill from a flood, dalliances with gopis (cow-herders)’, and interactions with demons and gods. Artwork has been created of the hill represented as a bull and a peacock, Krishna in a cave, the hill as a mountain of food, depicted in the floods brought on by Indra, and with the Yamuna River.

According to the Giriraj Chalisa (a forty verse hymn dedicated to Govardhan Hill) Govardhan in human form, went to Vrindavan with Pulastya and decided to stay there evermore. The sight of Govardhan Hill and Yamuna River in Vrindavan attracted the demigods who took forms of trees, deer, and monkeys to live in Vrindavan.

The lifting of Govardhan

Govardhan Puja is celebrated on the day after Diwali. It is the day upon which Lord Krishna defeated Indra, the deity of thunder and rain. As per the story, Krishna saw huge preparations for the annual offering to Indra and questions his father Nanda about it. He debated with the villagers about what their 'dharma' truly was. They were farmers, they should do their duty and concentrate on farming and protection of their cattle. He continued to say that all human beings should merely do their 'dharma', to the best of their ability and not pray or conduct sacrifices for natural phenomenon. The villagers were convinced by Krishna, and did not proceed with the special puja. Indra was then angered, and flooded the village. Krishna then lifted Mt Govardhan and held it up as protection to the people and cattle from the rain. Indra finally accepted defeat and recognized Krishna as the victor. He offered his prayers and left to his heavenly kingdom. According to some sources, the destructive cloud sent by Indra is Sāṁvartaka. This aspect of Krishna's life is mostly glossed over, but it actually set up on the basis of the karma-focused philosophy later detailed in the Bhagavad Gita.

The incident represented the downfall of Indra, and a new beginning in Hindu philosophy, from a more sacrifice-oriented worship to a more spiritual plane of thought.

Recent development
In 2018, the Uttar Pradesh Chief Minister Yogi Adityanath declared Govardhan as a pilgrimage centre along with Mathura, Baldev, Nandgaon, Radha Kund, and Gokul. The Yogi Adityanath Government has also planned to rejuvenate Govardhan Parvat with Dvapara Yuga flora such as kadamb, karoli, tamal, pakkad, and tilkan.

See also
Kusum Sarovar
Vrindavan
Govardhana Shila
Govardhan Puja

References

Further reading

External links

 Srila Prabhupada explains Govardhana Puja 
 http://www.icompositions.com/music/song.php?sid=199187Ballad of Govardhana 
 Ballad of Govardhana Hill 
 The Story of Govardhan
 krishna story lifting govardhan parvat
 Pictures of Govardhan Hill 
 Exclusive video of Parikrama of Govardhan Hill

Hindu pilgrimage sites in India
Locations in Hindu mythology
Hills of Uttar Pradesh
Tourist attractions in Mathura district
Sacred natural sites
Krishna